Koila was a town of ancient Thrace on the Thracian Chersonese. 

References

Populated places in ancient Thrace
Former populated places in Turkey
History of Çanakkale Province